Hsiao Shu-chin (born 5 May 1960) is a Taiwanese para table tennis player. She won a bronze medal at the 2000 Summer Paralympics and a silver at the 2004 Summer Paralympics.

Hsiao is a polio survivor. She worked in the Presidential Office Building.

References 

1960 births
Living people
Table tennis players at the 2000 Summer Paralympics
Table tennis players at the 2004 Summer Paralympics
Table tennis players at the 2012 Summer Paralympics
Medalists at the 2000 Summer Paralympics
Medalists at the 2004 Summer Paralympics
Sportspeople from Taipei
Paralympic medalists in table tennis
Taiwanese female table tennis players
Paralympic silver medalists for Chinese Taipei
Paralympic bronze medalists for Chinese Taipei
Paralympic table tennis players of Chinese Taipei
People with polio
Fu Jen Catholic University alumni
FESPIC Games competitors
21st-century Taiwanese people